Shymansky is a surname. Notable people with the surname include:

James A. Shymansky, American academic
Stanislav Shymansky (born 1985), Ukrainian sprint canoeist